James Woodall Rodgers (May 11, 1890 – July 6, 1961) was an American attorney, businessman, and mayor of Dallas, Texas.

Rogers was born in New Market, Alabama.  He received his B.A. degree from Vanderbilt University in 1912 and his LL.B. from the University of Texas in 1915.  He began his law practice in Dallas in 1916, but at the outbreak of World War I, Rodgers joined the United States Army.  He was honorably discharged in 1918 as a major in the artillery.  He married his wife, Edna Cristler on November 9, 1920.

Upon his return to Dallas, Rodgers became an associate with Saner & Saner but left in 1925 to found his own firm that specialized in oil and gas law.  His firm would eventually come to represent Standard Oil in legal matters.

In 1939, Rodgers was elected mayor of Dallas, a position he held until 1947.  Under his tenure, Love Field underwent expansion; construction began on Central Expressway (US 75); the Dallas Public Library; and the Garza-Little Elm Reservoir, which is currently one of Dallas's largest water supplies.

Rodgers also held positions as a trustee with the Dallas Museum of Fine Arts (now the Dallas Museum of Art) and as a director of the Dallas Symphony; the State Fair of Texas; and the Dallas Public Library.  He was also the founder and first president of the Greater Dallas Planning Council.

He died in Dallas, after a lengthy illness, on July 6, 1961.

Woodall Rodgers Freeway, which runs north of downtown Dallas, between U.S. Highway 75 and Interstate 35E is named in his honor, as is Woodall Rodgers Plaza, which connects the West End with Victory and runs under the highway that also bears his name.

External links
James Woodall Rodgers at the Texas State Historical Association
James Woodall Rodgers at the Houston Chronicle

1890 births
1961 deaths
Mayors of Dallas
Military personnel from Texas
People from Madison County, Alabama
20th-century American politicians
Vanderbilt University alumni
University of Texas alumni